Maxhunaj is a village in Vushtrri municipality, Kosovo.

Notes

References 

Villages in Vushtrri